Thalassiosiraceae is a family of diatoms in the order Thalassiosirales. The family of Thalassiosiraceae have the unique quality of having a flat valve face. These diatoms are common in brackish, nearshore, and open-ocean habitats, with approximately the same number of freshwater and marine species. Thalassiosiraceae are a centric diatom full of fultoportula. These can often be mistaken for Areola. These belong to many diatom families and can be found in different forms such as the different Areolae that can be found on Navicula or Gomphoneis known as lineolate and punctate. Unlike naviculaceae who are symmetrical in shape some Thalassiosiraceae take on being tangentially undulate.

The species Thalassiosira pseudonana was chosen as the first eukaryotic marine phytoplankton for whole genome sequencing. T. pseudonana was selected for this study because it is a model for diatom physiology studies, belongs to a genus widely distributed throughout the world's oceans, and has a relatively small genome at 34 mega base pairs. Scientists are researching diatom light absorption, using the marine diatom Thalassiosira.

References 

 
 
 

Thalassiosirales
Diatom families